Four Souls may refer to:

Four Souls (novel), a 2004 novel by Louise Erdrich
Lenny McBrowne and the Four Souls, an American jazz group
Four Souls, a 2002 ballet by Francesco Libetta
"Four Souls", a chapter of the manga series Saint Seiya: The Lost Canvas

See also
The Binding of Isaac: Four Souls, a card game
Jewel of Four Souls, a fictional object in the manga series Inuyasha